Miroslava "Mira" Stupica (née Todorović; 17 August 1923 – 19 August 2016) was a Serbian actress best known for her work in the theater, but also had extensive career on television and in films. Enjoying the enduring popularity for over 60 years and celebrated as the ‘actress of the century’ by her peers, she is considered one of the best Serbian actresses of all time.

Early life 
Miroslava Todorović was born in Gnjilane, Kingdom of Serbs, Croats and Slovenes as the first child of Serb parents — Danica Stanišić from Livno, Bosnia and  Herzegovina and Radomir Todorović from Orašac, both gymnasium professors assigned to teach in Gnjilane at the time. After Miroslava, the couple had three more children, three sons: Predrag (died at the age of two), Zoran (died at the age of three), and Borivoje who later went on to become a famous and accomplished actor himself.

Following the couple's teaching postings, the family later moved to Gornji Milanovac, in central Serbia, where Miroslava's father, a talented violinist, died young in 1932, and then to Aranđelovac, before eventually settling in Belgrade where Mira graduated secondary school at the city's Trade Academy (Trgovačka akademija).

Career

Theatre 
Todorović began acting during high school by enrolling in and completing the Artistic Theatre's acting studio in Belgrade, where she soon began acting professionally in 1940 after being noticed by Viktor Starčić. In 1941 she moved to Belgrade's National Theatre. Her early career, just like her personal life at the time, centered around then popular and established actor Milivoj "Mavid" Popović who became her husband in 1943. The couple had a daughter Mina before their four-year marriage ended. During and after World War II, she acted in theatres in Šabac (1943–45) and Niš (1945–47), after which she returned to the National Theatre in Belgrade.

In 1948, she got invited to the newly established Yugoslav Drama Theatre (JDP) by Bojan Stupica, tour de force of Serbian theatre who was in charge of creating JDP and making it the forerunner of the modern theatre in the state. Remaining at JDP on and off till 1970, she often changed theatre houses, though: 1955–57 Croatian National Theatre in Zagreb, JDP again 1957–59, then National Theatre in Belgrade 1959–63, JDP again 1963–70, and finally National theatre in Belgrade 1970–79. She guested in Atelje 212, Belgrade Drama Theatre, Zvezdara Theatre, and Titograd's National Theatre. On European tour she won international acclaim as Petrunjela in Dundo Maroje by Marin Držić in Vienna, Paris and Moscow.

Her work at JDP with Bojan Stupica and their subsequent marriage had a seminal influence on Mira’s maturity as an actress. She was known for her rich expression, emotivity, and inspiring temperament as well as for possessing universal aptitude toward acting, which allowed her to equally master both dramatic and comedic roles, and to successfully breaks barriers between genres. Many of her performances are considered to be anthology roles in Serbian theatre.

Apart from Petrunjela, others include: Živka (The Cabinet minister’s wife by Branislav Nušić), Joan of Arc (Saint Joan by George Bernard Shaw), Colombe (by Jean Anouilh), Grusha Vashnadze (The Caucasian Chalk Circle by Bertold Brecht), Lucietta (Le baruffe chiozzotte by Carlo Goldoni, Commissar (An Optimistic Tragedy by Vsevolod Vishnevsky), Glorija (by Ranko Marinković), Mirandolina (The Mistress of the Inn by Carlo Goldoni), Melita (Leda by Miroslav Krleža), Signora Ignazia (Tonight We Improvise by Luigi Pirandello), Mary (Mary fights with the angels by Pavel Kohout), Chérubin (The Marriage of Figaro by Beaumarchais), Ljubica (Đido by Janko Veselinović), Grushenka (The Brothers Karamazov by Fyodor Dostoyevsky), Alexandra Negina (Talents and Admirers by Aleksandr Ostrovsky), Danica (Ljubav by Milan Đoković), Madame Sans-Gêne (by Victorien Sardou), Actress (L'Otage by Paul Claudel), Baroness Castelli-Glembay (Messrs. Glembay by Miroslav Krleža), Nastasya Filipovna (The Idiot by Fyodor Dostoyevsky, Jenny Diver (The Threepenny Opera by Bertrold Brecht), Anna Karenina by Leo Tolstoy, and Lady Milford (Intrigue and Love by Friedrich Schiller).

Film 
Although predominantly a theatrical actress, she landed several prominent film roles, especially in the 1950s and 1960s. She made her feature film debut in 1951 film Bakonja fra Brne by Fedor Hanžeković, followed by the roles in The Parvenus (1953; directed by Bojan Stupica), I Was Stronger (1953; Gustav Gavrin), Stojan Mutikaša (1954; Fedor Hanžeković), Hanka (1955; Slavko Vorkapić), U mreži (1956; Bojan Stupica), Mali čovek (1957; Žika Čukulić), The Fourteenth Day (1960; Zdravko Velimirović), Destination Death (1964; Wolfgang Staudte), Narodni poslanik (1964; Stole Janković), Roj (1966; Mića Popović), Pre rata (1966; Vuk Babić), Palma među palmama (1967; Milo Đukanović), Delije (1968; Mića Popović), Sunce tuđeg neba (1968; Milutin Kosovac), Krvava bajka (1969; Branimir Tori Janković), Doručak sa đavolom (1971; Mika Antić), Kako umreti (1972; Miomir Miki Stamenković), Zvezde su oči ratnika (1972; Branimir Tori Janković) and Sablazan (1982; Dragovan Jovanović). After a long absence from the silver screen, younger generation of Serbian movie directors again showed interest in her, so she appeared in well received supporting roles in 2006 in Miroslav Momčilović’s Seven and a half, and, in 2011 in Srđan Dragojević’s  The Parade.

Television 
After appearing in several TV movies, filmed plays and episodes of TV series, she landed a role of Kika Bibić, illiterate woman who learns to read in educational series TV Bukvar (TV Spelling-book), written by Aleksandar Popović for Radio Television Belgrade. Aired from 1968 to 1969, it brought Stupica an exceptional broad popularity and critical praise for her remarkable creation of folksy Kika. Many people believed that she is a real person, so much that she had a whole page in daily Politika on Saturday to answer to the letters sent to Kika. Her other noteworthy TV roles include those in mini-series Sedam sekretara SKOJ-a (1981), Španac (1982) and especially Priče iz fabrike (1985) and Otvorena vrata (1995).

Personal life 
In 1943, at the age of 19, she married popular Serbian actor and famous playboy Milivoj "Mavid" Popović (1909–94), who was 14 years her senior. Their wedding was a popular media event in German-occupied Serbia. They had a daughter Jasmina-Mina, but soon divorced. In 1948 she married Bojan Stupica, Slovene theatrical director, who was a major force in Serbian theatre until his death on 22 May 1970.

Widowed, in 1973 she married communist politician Cvijetin Mijatović, remaining with him until his death on 15 November 1993. From 15 May 1980 to 15 May 1981, Mijatović presided over the Yugoslav Presidency, the country's collective presidency, making Stupica Yugoslavia's first lady in that period.

Apart from her popular actor brother Bora Todorović, her nephew, Bora’s son Srđan, is a musician, a former member of Ekaterina Velika and Disciplin A Kitschme, as well as a popular actor in Serbian cinema since the mid-1980s.

In 2015, she settled at a retirement home in the Belgrade borough of Zemun.

On 10 March 2016 Stupica suffered a stroke, and after months without leaving the hospital, died on 19 August 2016.

Honours/Accolades 
Stupica was awarded the Award of the Federal Government of FNRJ in 1949 and Sedmojulska nagrada (at the time the highest government award in Serbia) in 1960.

She also won two awards at Sterijino pozorje in Novi Sad, the most important theatrical festival in Serbia, three Golden Lauren Wreath awards at MES in Sarajevo, and Ljubiša Jovanović award in Šabac in 1986. Stupica was awarded the highest theatrical awards for lifetime achievement in Serbian theatre, including Dobričin prsten in 1981, Statuette of Joakim Vujić in 1985 and lifetime achievement awards at Sterijino pozorje in 1984, and at the Dani Zorana Radmilovića festival in Zaječar in 2013. At Pula Film Festival, top film festival in former Yugoslavia, she won two best actress awards, in 1954 (Stojan Mutikaša) and Golden Arena in 1966 (Roj).

At the Filmski susreti, actor’s festival in Niš, she was awarded at the inaugural festival in 1966 as the best actress (Roj). In 1969 she and Miodrag Petrović Čkalja won an award as the best acting couple of the year (Stupica for TV Bukvar). In 2006 she won an award for the best supporting female role in Seven and a half and in 2007 Pavle Vuisić award, the highest film acting award in Serbia, for her lifetime achievement in the movies.

In 2001, on the celebration of her 60-years of acting. Stupica on the stage publicly called for establishing the Velika Žanka award (Great Žanka), in honor of Žanka Stokić (1887–1947), today generally considered the best theatrical Serbian actress ever, pointing out that there are no appropriate awards for actresses in their prime, when they are too old for the debutant awards and still too young for the life-time awards. In 2002 it was announced that new award will be established next year, under the name of Žanka Stokić award. Mira Stupica was the president for life of the jury and the award has been awarded yearly ever since.

On 23 September 2013, an exhibition titled Mira Stupica – actress of the century was held in the Museum of the National Theatre in Belgrade.

In 2000 she published her autobiography Šaka soli (A handful of salt). Book, which was written in specific, almost scenic style, became a bestseller in Serbia.

Roles

Theatre (selected)

Filmography

Television

References

External links 

MIRA STUPICA: ŠAKA SOLI (3): Kako je Tito zavoleo Platona, NIN, 10 February 2000
Nepoderiva, Glas javnosti, 25 November 2001

1923 births
2016 deaths
People from Gjilan
Kosovo Serbs
20th-century Serbian actresses
21st-century Serbian actresses
20th-century Serbian writers
21st-century Serbian writers
Serbian dramatists and playwrights
Golden Arena winners
Laureates of the Ring of Dobrica
Serbian film actresses
Serbian stage actresses
Serbian voice actresses
Serbian television actresses
Yugoslav actresses